"For a Few Dollars More" is a song by the British rock band Smokie from their 1978 studio album The Montreux Album. It was the album's first single. The song first came out in January 1978 as a single and later appeared on the album, which was released in October.

Background and writing 
The song was written by Nicky Chinn and Mike Chapman and produced by Mike Chapman.

Charts

Cover versions 
Chris Norman included his solo cover of the song on his 2000 studio album "Full Circle".

References

External links 
 "For a Few Dollars More" at Discogs

1978 songs
1978 singles
Smokie (band) songs
Songs written by Nicky Chinn
Songs written by Mike Chapman
Song recordings produced by Mike Chapman
RAK Records singles